Amber van der Hulst (born 21 September 1999) is a Dutch professional racing cyclist, who currently rides for UCI Women's Continental Team . In June 2019, at the European Games in Minsk, she won a silver medal in the madison event.

Major results
2016
 9th Gent–Wevelgem Juniors
2017
 1st  Overall EPZ Omloop van Borsele
1st Stage 2
 2nd Gent–Wevelgem Juniors
 2nd Healthy Ageing Tour Juniors
2019
 8th EPZ Omloop van Borsele
 8th Omloop van de IJsseldelta
2020
 4th Omloop van de Westhoek - Memorial Stive Vermaut
 6th Grand Prix International d'Isbergues
2021
 3rd GP Eco-Struct
 4th Omloop van de Westhoek - Memorial Stive Vermaut
 9th Le Samyn
 9th Overall Healthy Ageing Tour
 9th Dwars door het Hageland WE

References

External links
 

1999 births
Living people
Dutch female cyclists
Place of birth missing (living people)
Cyclists at the 2019 European Games
European Games medalists in cycling
European Games silver medalists for the Netherlands
People from Leiderdorp
Cyclists from South Holland
21st-century Dutch women